Cecilio Salazar maternal surname Caceres (born December 9, 1954) is an Argentine trade unionist and politician.

He has been the mayor of San Pedro, Buenos Aires since December 10, 2015.

References

1954 births
Living people
Mayors of places in Argentina
Argentine trade unionists
People from Buenos Aires Province